Ewenki Autonomous Banner (Mongolian:    , Eveŋki öbertegen jasaqu qosiɣu, Эвэнк өөртөө засах хошуу) is an autonomous banner that lies on the border between northwestern Greater Khingan and Hulun Buir grasslands and directly south of the urban district of Hailar in the prefecture-level city of Hulunbuir, People's Republic of China.

Administrative divisions
These subdivisions are further divided into 44  and 20 Residential Communities. The banner's seat of government is the town of Bayan Tohoi.

Geography and Climate
The overwhelming majority of the banner's area is grassland, although the banner also includes a sizable amount of woodlands.

Economy 
A number of local state-run enterprises are located in Ewenki Autonomous Banner, many of which deal with natural resources such as coal and lumber. These enterprises include Huaneng Yimin Coal and Electricity Company, which produces thermal and photovoltaic electricity, Shenhua Dayan Energy Group, and Inner Mongolia Tongda Coal Industry Corporation.

Ewenki Autonomous Banner's gross domestic product totaled 10.69273 billion renminbi (RMB) as of 2019, a 2.3% increase from 2018. Of this, 8.47% came from the autonomous banner's primary sector, 55.16% came from the secondary sector, and 36.37% came from the tertiary sector.

In 2019, households in the autonomous banner earned an average annual disposable income of 33,168 RMB. The autonomous banner's urban households earned an average of 33,214 RMB in disposable income, ranking 58th out of the 101 county-level divisions in Inner Mongolia for which this statistic was reported; and rural households in the autonomous banner earned an average of 24,926 RMB in disposable income, ranking 9th out of the 90 county-level divisions for which this statistic was reported.

Consumer retail sales in the autonomous banner totaled 2.06048 billion RMB as of 2019.

As of 2019, there were 21,204 mobile telephone subscriptions in the Ewenki Autonomous Banner, accounting for 14.50% of its total population, and 29,769 internet subscriptions, accounting for 21.76% of its total population.

In 2019, Ewenki Autonomous Banner earned 736.62 million RMB in public budget revenue, ranking 40th out of the 103 county-level divisions in Inner Mongolia.

Agriculture 
Ewenki Autonomous Banner produced 49,145 tons of grain in 2019, ranking 71st out of the 96 county-level divisions in Inner Mongolia which for which this statistic was reported. In the same year, the autonomous banner produced 17,749 tons of meat, ranking 57th out of Inner Mongolia's 103 county-level divisions.

Demographics
As of 2019, the autonomous banner's population of 136,832 ranks 71st out of Inner Mongolia's 103 county-level divisions. This total was a 0.7% decline from the previous year.

Ethnicity 
The autonomous banner's government reported in 2013 that ethnic minorities within the banner totaled 58,843 people, accounting for 40.8% of the total population. In addition to the Han Chinese majority in the autonomous banner, sizable minority communities include the Evenki, Mongol, Daur, Manchu, Hui, Korean, Oroqen, and Sibe people.

Education 
The autonomous banner has 10 primary schools and 11 secondary schools.

Healthcare 
As of 2019, Ewenki Autonomous Banner's medical institutions host 604 beds, and are staffed by 1,100 personnel.

Transport 

Hailar International Airport is the nearest airport.

Gallery

References

External links

More about Evenks

Autonomous counties of the People's Republic of China
Hulunbuir
County-level divisions of Inner Mongolia
Evenks